An on-ride camera is a camera mounted alongside the track of a roller coaster, log flume or other thrill ride that automatically photographs all of the riders on each passing vehicle. They are often mounted at the most intense or fastest part of the ride, resulting in humorously distorted expressions due to fear or wind resistance. The pictures are then available for viewing and purchase as a souvenir.

Upon exiting the ride, park guests pass a booth or shop where their vehicle's pictures are on display screens. Depending on the size of the vehicle used by the attraction, the entire car or groups of one, two, or four may comprise one photograph. The display images are numbered, and customers wishing to purchase a photo take the appropriate number to a cashier. This photo shop may be located in the same building as the displays or in a separate shop nearby. Many parks offer minimal editing tools (such as red-eye effect removal) before purchase.  The photo is usually ready within minutes of purchase. Single prints in varying sizes are available, provided in cardboard folio bearing the name of the park or ride.  Often specialty products, such as posters, keychains or t-shirts, are available also.

An unusual camera configuration can be found on the hydraulically launched roller coasters Top Thrill Dragster at Cedar Point and Kingda Ka at Six Flags Great Adventure. Both had two cameras (Kingda Ka's second on-ride camera has since been removed), one during the high-speed launch segment and another at the final brake run, providing riders with a before and after picture of themselves on those harrowing rides.  Another unusual configuration is Hydra the Revenge at Dorney Park & Wildwater Kingdom.  The ride features two cameras; one takes a rider's picture before a loop and the other takes a picture while the rider is upside-down.  Hydra the Revenge is also the only roller coaster to take a picture while the rider is upside down.

Video

A relatively new trend in the industry is on-ride video cameras. On some rides, on-ride videos are recorded by cameras mounted alongside the track, similar to on-ride photo cameras. This provides a third person montage-style of cuts which show the train entering, passing through and then leaving the frame. Rides that use this system include SheiKra at Busch Gardens Tampa Bay, Hollywood Rip Ride Rockit at Universal Studios Florida, and Mystic Timbers at Kings Island.

Using the alternate system, videos are recorded by cameras mounted inside the ride vehicles, usually on the back of the seat in front of the subject. This provides a first-person stream of consciousness-style film, showing the riders' emotions close up from start to finish. Some coasters that use this system are Thunderhawk at Michigan's Adventure, Hollywood Rip Ride Rockit at Universal Studios Florida, and Verbolten at Busch Gardens Williamsburg. FireWhip at Beto Carrero World utilizes this style; a method also previously used by Saw: The Ride and  The Swarm at Thorpe Park which no longer offer the service, with the camera mounted to the seat backs.

References

Cameras by type
Roller coaster elements